Mario Pérez Plascencia (19 February 1927 – c. 1985) was a Mexican football midfielder who played for Mexico in the 1950 FIFA World Cup. He also played for Club Deportivo Marte.

Pérez died during the 1985/1986 season.

References

External links
FIFA profile

1927 births

Year of death uncertain
Mexican footballers
Mexico international footballers
Association football midfielders
1950 FIFA World Cup players
1985 deaths